The Breeders Crown 2YO Filly Pace is a harness racing event for two-year-old Standardbred fillies pacers. It is one part of the Breeders Crown annual series of twelve races for both Standardbred trotters and trotters. First run in 1985, it is contested over a distance of one mile. Race organizers have awarded the event to various racetracks across North America. The 2017 race will be held at Hoosier Park in Anderson, Indiana, United States.

Historical race events
In 2010, Pocono Downs became the first venue to host all 12 events on a single night.

In her final start of 2014, JK Shesalady made the Breeders Crown her fourteenth straight victory in an undefeated season and would become the first 2-year-old filly in history to be voted the Dan Patch Harness Horse of the Year Award.

North American Locations
Woodbine Racetrack (Wdb) Ontario (9)
Meadowlands Racetrack (Mxx) New Jersey (6)
Pompano Park (Ppk) Florida (5)
Mohawk Raceway (Moh) Ontario (4)
Pocono Downs (Pcd) Pennsylvania (2)
Colonial Downs (Cln) Virginia (1) 
Freehold Raceway (Fhl) New Jersey (1)
Freestate Raceway (Fsr) Maryland (1)
Garden State Park (Gsp) New Jersey (1)
Maywood Park (May) Illinois (1)
Rosecroft Raceway (Rcr) Maryland (1)
Yonkers Raceway (YR) New York (1)

Records
 Most wins by a driver
 6 – John Campbell (1984, 1988, 1990, 1991, 1992, 1995)

 Most wins by a trainer
 4 – Bruce Nickells (1988, 1990, 1991, 1992)

 Stakes record
 1:50 2/5 – JK Shesalady (2014)

Winners of the Breeders Crown 2YO Filly Pace

See also
List of Breeders Crown Winners

References

Recurring sporting events established in 1984
Harness racing in the United States
Breeders Crown
Harness racing in Canada
Horse races in New Jersey
Horse races in Florida
Horse races in Pennsylvania
Horse races in Virginia
Horse races in Maryland
Horse races in Illinois
Horse races in New York (state)
Horse races in Ontario